Tobamovirus is a genus of positive-strand RNA viruses in the family Virgaviridae. Many plants, including tobacco, potato, tomato, and squash, serve as natural hosts. Diseases associated with this genus include: necrotic lesions on leaves. The name Tobamovirus comes from the host and symptoms of the first virus discovered (Tobacco mosaic virus).

There are four informal subgroups within this genus: these are the tobamoviruses that infect the brassicas, cucurbits, malvaceous, and solanaceous plants. The main differences between these groups are genome sequences, and respective range of host plants. There are 37 species in this genus.

Structure 
Tobamoviruses are non-enveloped, with helical rod geometries, and helical symmetry. The diameter is around 18 nm, with a length of 300–310 nm. Genomes are linear and non-segmented, around 6.3–6.5kb in length.

Genome
The RNA genome encodes at least four polypeptides: these are the non-structural protein and the read-through product which are involved in virus replication (RNA-dependent RNA polymerase, RdRp); the movement protein (MP) which is necessary for the virus to move between cells and the coat protein (CP). The read-through portion of the RdRp may be expressed as a separate protein in TMV.  The virus is able to replicate without the movement or coat proteins, but the other two are essential. The non-structural protein has domains suggesting it is involved in RNA capping and the read-through product has a motif for an RNA polymerase. The movement proteins are made very early in the infection cycle and localized to the plasmodesmata, they are probably involved in host specificity as they are believed to interact with some host cell factors.

Life cycle
Viral replication is cytoplasmic. Entry into the host cell is achieved by penetration into the host cell. Replication follows the positive stranded RNA virus replication model. Positive stranded RNA virus transcription is the method of transcription. Translation takes place by suppression of termination. The virus exits the host cell by monopartite non-tubule guided viral movement. Plants serve as the natural host. Transmission routes are mechanical.

Enzymes
Tobamovirus RNA-dependent RNA polymerases are homologous with bromoviruses, ilarviruses, tobraviruses, and the carnation mottle virus.

Routes of infection
The infection is localized to begin with but if the virus remains unchallenged it will spread via the vascular system into a systemic infection. The exact mechanism the virus uses to move throughout the plant is unknown but the interaction of pectin methylesterase, a cellular enzyme important for cell wall metabolism and plant development, with the movement protein has been implicated.

Evolution
These viruses are thought to have codiverged with their hosts from a common ancestor. There are at least 3 distinct clades of tobamoviruses, which to some extent follow their host ranges: that is, there is one infecting solanaceous species; a second infecting cucurbits and legumes and a third infecting the crucifers.

Classification

Species 

The genus contains the following species:

 Bell pepper mottle virus (BPeMV)
 Brugmansia mild mottle virus
 Cactus mild mottle virus (CMMoV)
 Clitoria yellow mottle virus
 Cucumber fruit mottle mosaic virus
 Cucumber green mottle mosaic virus (CGMMV)
 Cucumber mottle virus
 Frangipani mosaic virus (FrMV)
 Hibiscus latent Fort Pierce virus (HLFPV)
 Hibiscus latent Singapore virus (HLSV)
 Kyuri green mottle mosaic virus
 Maracuja mosaic virus (MarMV)
 Obuda pepper virus (ObPV)
 Odontoglossum ringspot virus (ORSV)
 Opuntia chlorotic ringspot virus
 Paprika mild mottle virus
 Passion fruit mosaic virus
 Pepper mild mottle virus (PMMoV)
 Plumeria mosaic virus
 Rattail cactus necrosis-associated virus (RCNaV)
 Rehmannia mosaic virus
 Ribgrass mosaic virus (HRV)
 Sammons's Opuntia virus (SOV)
 Streptocarpus flower break virus
 Sunn-hemp mosaic virus (SHMV)
 Tobacco latent virus
 Tobacco mild green mosaic virus
 Tobacco mosaic virus (TMV)
 Tomato brown rugose fruit virus  (ToBRFV)
 Tomato mosaic virus (ToMV)
 Tomato mottle mosaic virus
 Tropical soda apple mosaic virus
 Turnip vein-clearing virus (TVCV)
 Ullucus mild mottle virus
 Wasabi mottle virus (WMoV)
 Yellow tailflower mild mottle virus
 Youcai mosaic virus (YoMV) aka oilseed rape mosaic virus (ORMV)
 Zucchini green mottle mosaic virus

Proposed members
Proposed, but currently unrecognised members of the genus include:

 Chara corallina virus (CCV)
 Nicotiana velutina mosaic virus (NVMV)

References

Further reading

External links 

 ICTV Online (10th) Report: Virgaviridae 
 Viralzone: Tobamovirus

 
Viral plant pathogens and diseases
Virus genera